Alkalibacillus halophilus is a Gram-positive, halophilic, spore-forming and motile bacterium from the genus Alkalibacillus which has been isolated from saline soil from China.

References

 

Bacillaceae
Bacteria described in 2009